Lost in You is a song by British singer Rod Stewart, released in 1988 as the lead single from his fifteenth studio album Out of Order. It was written by Stewart (lyrics) and Andy Taylor (music), and produced by Stewart, Taylor and Bernard Edwards. "Lost in You" peaked at No. 12 on the US Billboard Hot 100 and No. 21 on the UK Singles Chart.

Background
In the liner notes of Storyteller – The Complete Anthology: 1964–1990, Stewart said of the song: "It was a Wednesday evening and we'd been hard at it in the studio, coming up with nothing. I said to the assembled band that Wednesday evening was football practice night [and] asked Andy Taylor to experiment while I was gone and maybe have something when I returned at 11pm. ["Lost in You"] was the result."

Music video
The song's music video was directed by Daniel Kleinman and Jonathan Kaplan, and produced by Daniel Stewart and Beth Broday for Limelight Productions. It received heavy rotation on MTV.

Critical rception
Upon its release, Billboard described the song as a "straight-ahead rock item", adding "[Stewart] sounds as good as ever on a strong song with equally powerful production." Cash Box noted the "very nice chorus hook" and "very nice string parts in the chorus". They added that Stewart provided his "usual consistent performance, with a voice that was born to rock". Music & Media considered the song an "excellent rocker" with "a boiling production". Richard Lowe of Smash Hits described "Lost in You" as a "terrific rock record that sounds a teensy weensy bit U2-ish".

Track listing
7" single
 "Lost in You" – 4:20
 "Almost Illegal" – 4:30

12" single
 "Lost in You" (Extended Remix) – 5:34
 "Lost in You" – 4:20
 "Almost Illegal" – 4:30

Cassette single (US release)
 "Lost in You" – 4:20
 "Almost Illegal" – 4:30

CD single (German release)
 "Lost in You" (Fade) – 4:20
 "Almost Illegal" – 4:30
 "Lost in You" (Extended Remix) – 5:34
 "Baby Jane" – 4:42

CD single (US promo)
 "Lost in You" (Edit) – 4:29
 "Lost in You" (LP Version) – 4:57

Personnel

Lost in You
 Rod Stewart – vocals
 Andy Taylor, Michael Landau – guitars
 Bob Glaub – bass
 David Lindley – mandolin
 Tony Thompson – drums
 Kelly Emberg – female vocals
 Bruce Miller – string arrangement

Almost Illegal
 Rod Stewart – vocals
 Andy Taylor – guitar
 Bob Glaub – bass
 David Lindley – fiddle
 Tony Brock – drums

Production
 Rod Stewart, Andy Taylor, Bernard Edwards – producers
 Bernard Edwards, Steve MacMillan – mixing
 Steve MacMillan, Jeff Hendrickson, David Tickle, Paul Wertheimer – engineers
 Alan Abrahamson – assistant engineer
 Bernard Edwards, Steven Rinkoff – extended remix of "Lost in You"

Other
 Randee St. Nicholas – photography
 Sharmen Liao – computer illustration

Charts

References

1988 singles
1988 songs
Rod Stewart songs
Songs written by Rod Stewart
Songs written by Andy Taylor (guitarist)
Song recordings produced by Bernard Edwards
Warner Records singles